Lancelot Blackburne (sometimes Blackburn, Blackborne or Blackbourn[e]; 10 December 165823 March 1743) was an English clergyman, who became Archbishop of York, and – in popular belief – a pirate.

He was described by Horace Walpole, in his Memories, as "…Blackbourn, the jolly old Archbishop of York, who had all the manners of a man of quality, though he had been a buccaneer, and was a clergyman; but he retained nothing of his first profession, except his seraglio".

Early life and career as a pirate
He was born in London, a younger brother of Richard Blackburne. He attended Westminster School, and in 1676 entered Christ Church, Oxford. He graduated in 1680, was ordained a deacon on 25 September 1681 at Christ Church by John Fell, Bishop of Oxford, and travelled to the West Indies. In January 1684 he was granted an MA by the university; at this time, he is known to have been in Nevis. A popular story recounts that he spent these years sailing with buccaneers, either as their chaplain or as a pirate himself; there is little evidence either way, although a record of 1681 notes that he was paid £20 by Charles II for "secret services".

Archbishop of York
He returned to England in 1684, marrying Catherine Talbot (the elder sister of William Talbot) on 2 September at the Savoy Chapel, and shortly thereafter took up the first of a set of church posts.

In 1691 he became a Canon of Exeter, and in 1705 Dean of Exeter, succeeding William Wake whose patronage would later stand him in good stead, and in 1715 Archdeacon of Cornwall. In 1716 he travelled to Hanover as the personal chaplain to George I and the next year became Bishop of Exeter. As Bishop, he was active in the House of Lords where he supported the repeal of the Occasional Conformity Act.

In 1724 he became Archbishop of York (and therefore a Privy Counsellor), a position he held until his death. While he continued to be politically active, he often neglected his spiritual duties; he appears to have carried out few confirmations, and stopped ordaining priests after 10 years. Instead, he kept apartments in Downing Street, London and spent much time at the royal court. Downing Street is listed as his abode on the 1739 royal charter of the Foundling Hospital, a charity for which he was a founding governor. Blackburne was Lord High Almoner from 1723 to 1743.

His career was controversial, with rumours that he had secretly married George I to his mistress. The Dictionary of National Biography mentions "his reputation for carnality" and "the laxity of his moral precepts", while Brewer's Rogues, Villains and Eccentrics comments that "[his] behaviour was seldom of a standard to be expected of an archbishop. In many respects, his behaviour was seldom of a standard to be expected of a pirate." He was famously ejected by John Disney, the vicar of St. Mary's Church, Nottingham, after a confirmation service during which he asked for his pipe, tobacco and ale.  One local legend in York even claimed that Dick Turpin was his butler.

Blackburne died at his home in Downing Street, Westminster on 23 March 1743 after a "lingering illness". His wife Catherine had died on 9June 1726 at the age of 80 and they left no children. It has often been claimed that he fathered Thomas Hayter; there is no conclusive evidence either way: he did not himself identify Hayter as his son, but he did leave a sizeable portion of his estate to Hayter.

Legacy
In a 1780 letter to David Dalrymple, Horace Walpole gave a lengthy description of Blackburne:

See Edmund Waller

Styles and titles
1658–1681: Lancelot Blackburne Esq.
1681–1691: The Reverend Lancelot Blackburne
1691–1705: The Reverend Canon Lancelot Blackburne
1705–1717: The Very Reverend Lancelot Blackburne
1717–1724: The Right Reverend Lancelot Blackburne
1724–1743: The Most Reverend and Right Honourable Lancelot Blackburne

References

The Oxford Dictionary of National Biography
Horace Walpole, Letters, Volume 4 (at Project Gutenberg)

External links

Contemporary image of Lancelot Blackburne at the National Portrait Gallery.

1658 births
1743 deaths
Archbishops of York
Bishops of Exeter
Deans of Exeter
Archdeacons of Cornwall
Alumni of Christ Church, Oxford
18th-century Church of England bishops
18th-century Anglican archbishops
People educated at Westminster School, London
British pirates
Members of the Privy Council of Great Britain